CRR may refer to:

Capital Requirements Regulation,  a European regulation on prudential requirements for credit institutions and investment firms
Coefficient of residuals resistance, (in Statistics) a random measurement on residuals in piecewise regression analysis 
Convergence rate of residuals, (in Statistics) an alternative term with the same meanings as the coefficient of residuals resistance
Corrour railway station
Cross River Rail
Reserve requirement or cash reserve ratio
Binomial options pricing model or Cox Ross Rubinstein option pricing model
Clinchfield Railroad
Cat Righting Reflex, The intrinsic ability for cats to land on their feet by correcting their orientation while falling
Carolina Algonquian language (ISO 639-3 language code)
 The Center For Reproductive Rights
 The Current Run Rate (Cricket)
 Curia Regis roll
 Cross Region Replication, used to copy objects across Amazon S3 buckets in different AWS Regions
 Cost Revenue Ratio, also known as efficiency ratio